Road Time was the first live concert recording of the Toshiko Akiyoshi – Lew Tabackin Big Band.  The recording was made at three concerts in Tōkyō and Ōsaka, during a 1976 Japan tour and the double album received a 1977 Grammy nomination in the "Best Jazz Performance - Big Band" category.

Track listing
LP 1 side A
"Tuning Up" – 16:48
"Warning: Success May Be Hazardous To Your Health" – 7:33
LP 1 side B
"Henpecked Old Man" – 22:54
LP 2 side A
"Soliloquy" –  8:37
"Kogun" – 10:40
LP 2 side B
"Since Perry" / "Yet Another Tear" – 13:46
"Road Time Shuffle" – 6:34
All arrangements by Toshiko Akiyoshi.  
All songs composed by Akiyoshi except "Yet Another Tear" (Tabackin).

Personnel
Toshiko Akiyoshi – piano
Lew Tabackin – tenor saxophone and flute
Tom Peterson – tenor saxophone
Dick Spencer – alto saxophone
Gary Foster – alto saxophone
Bill Byrne – baritone saxophone
Steven Huffsteter – trumpet
Bobby Shew – trumpet
Richard Cooper – trumpet
Mike Price – trumpet
Bill Reichenbach Jr. – trombone
Jim Sawyer – trombone
Jimmy Knepper – trombone
Phil Teele – bass trombone
Don Baldwin – bass
Peter Donald – drums

Guest Artists:
Kisaku Katada – kotsuzumi (on "Kogun")
Yutaka Yazaki – ōtsuzumi (on "Kogun")

References / External Links

RCA Victor Records RVC RCA-9115 ~ RCA-9116
[ Allmusic]
1977 Grammy nomination, Best Jazz Performance - Big Band (LA Times link)

Toshiko Akiyoshi – Lew Tabackin Big Band albums
1976 live albums